Chhokangparo, or Chhokang Paro, is a small village nestled deep in the Tsum Valley of Gandaki Province; it is only just inside Nepal, as the Nepal-Chinese border is only  away when heading due north. The Mu-Chhule Nile river runs through the valley below.

References 

Populated places in Gandaki Province